Iryna Chuzhynova (born 7 August 1972) is a road cyclist from Ukraine. She represented her nation at the 2004 Summer Olympics. She also rode at the 2002 and 2004 UCI Road World Championships.

References

External links
 profile at Cyclingarchives.com

Ukrainian female cyclists
Cyclists at the 2004 Summer Olympics
Olympic cyclists of Ukraine
Living people
Sportspeople from Zhytomyr
1972 births